Karie Dombrowski ( Ross) is an American former sports broadcaster. She worked as both a sports anchor and reporter for ABC, NBC and CBS network affiliates and as a cable television broadcast reporter. Ross was ESPN's third female on-air personality, and she was the first female reporter on ESPN’s College Football GameDay.

Early life
Ross was born in Norman, Oklahoma, raised in Clinton, Oklahoma by her parents Lanny and Janet Ross. Ross attended Clinton High School where she served as the school newspaper's sports editor. She was a supporter of Oklahoma Sooners sports in many ways: a baseball batgirl, a wrestling mat maid, and a football and basketball pompon squad member. 

Ross went on to study at the University of Oklahoma. She interned at KOKH-TV during her senior year at Oklahoma. She began her broadcasting journalism career at KOCO-TV in Oklahoma City.

Broadcast career
In 1981, Ross earned the title Maid of Cotton. The role had her serving as America's global ambassador to the cotton industry and promoting cotton use while traveling abroad. Ross spent 18 months at KOCO-TV; four years at Columbus, Ohio's WBNS-TV; two years in Bristol, Connecticut for ESPN; and nine months at Sports News Network in Washington, D.C. After a 9-month hiatus, she landed at KLAS-TV, becoming Las Vegas's first female weekday sports anchor, where she lasted less than a year. She went to WTVJ in Miami. On December 16, 1992, she met Dombrowski when the expansion Florida Marlins signed Benito Santiago. Santiago hit the 1993 Marlins first home run in April and another month later Dombrowski asked her out. On December 31, 1995, Ross married Dombrowski in Oklahoma City. The couple settled in the Detroit suburb of Bloomfield Hills, Michigan. They had two children by 2004.

Ross was regarded as one of the first female sportscasters with a solid knowledge of sports, following in the footsteps of Gayle Gardner. Ross was one of the first women to speak up about workplace conditions for women in her industry. Her service at GameDay was all voice work.

Personal life
Ross married baseball executive Dave Dombrowski.

References

1950s births
20th-century American women
21st-century American women
American television sports announcers
American women television personalities
College football announcers
ESPN people
Living people
Major League Baseball broadcasters
National Football League announcers
People from Clinton, Oklahoma
People from Norman, Oklahoma
Television personalities from Oklahoma
University of Oklahoma alumni
Women sports announcers